The 688th Aircraft Control and Warning Squadron is an inactive United States Air Force unit. It was last assigned to the 31st Air Division, Aerospace Defense Command, stationed at Amarillo Air Force Base, Texas. It was inactivated on 8 September 1968.

The unit was a General Surveillance Radar squadron providing for the air defense of the United States.

Lineage
 Activated as 688th Aircraft Control and Warning Squadron
 Activated on 1 October 1953
 Discontinued and inactivated on 8 September 1968

Assignments
 25th Air Division, 1 October 1953
 33d Air Division, 26 December 1953
 Albuquerque Air Defense Sector, 1 January 1960
 Oklahoma City Air Defense Sector, 15 September 1960
 4752d Air Defense Wing, 1 September 1961
 Oklahoma City Air Defense Sector, 25 June 1963
 31st Air Division, 1 April 1966 – 8 September 1968

Stations
 Geiger Field, Washington, 1 October 1953
 Tinker AFB, Oklahoma, 26 December 1953
 Amarillo AFB, Texas, 1 October 1954 – 8 September 1968

References

  Cornett, Lloyd H. and Johnson, Mildred W., A Handbook of Aerospace Defense Organization  1946 - 1980,  Office of History, Aerospace Defense Center, Peterson AFB, CO (1980).
 Winkler, David F. & Webster, Julie L., Searching the Skies, The Legacy of the United States Cold War Defense Radar Program,  US Army Construction Engineering Research Laboratories, Champaign, IL (1997).

External links

Radar squadrons of the United States Air Force
Aerospace Defense Command units
Military units and formations established in 1953